Juan Nepomucino Goetz was an Austrian Catholic priest whose arrival in Cuba led to two extraordinary controversies.

Goetz became Professor of Philosophy and Morality at the Imperial and Royal University of Vienna, and then, desiring to travel, was appointed music chaplain of the Cathedral of Santo Domingo in Hispaniola (Dominican Republic). Later, as priest and rector, he moved to San Fernando de Monte Cristi, and then to the wealthy parish of Môle Saint-Nicolas in Haiti. There he witnessed the slave uprising and the occupation of his parish by the British. 

When Toussaint-Louverture drove out the British, he rang the church bells and celebrated. However, in the following period, Goetz fled to Santiago de Cuba, where his knowledge of languages gave him a place as the 'foreigners' priest.

Goetz in Santiago de Cuba 
When Esteban Salas y Castro, choirmaster in the Cathedral of Santiago de Cuba, died in 1803, the election of the new Maestro de Capilla was an extraordinary event. It had been a foregone conclusion that Francisco José Hierrezuelo, long-time assistant of Salas, would be elected. Came the day, and Hierrezuelo spotted a certain well-qualified German priest in the choir. Blind with rage, and fearing the bishop had planned a conspiracy to thwart him, Hierrezuelo refused to take the examination, picked up his pen and wrote infuriated letters. The bishop persuaded the German, none other than Goetz, to renounce his candidacy, but Hierrezuelo had so offended the bishop and the town council by his irate letters that, despite grovelling apologies, he got only a minor position in the chapel. He was never to become a maestro. The competent and hard-working Juan París was appointed, and Goetz moved on to Havana, where his arrival also had remarkable consequences.

Goetz in Havana 
In Havana, choirmaster Lazo de la Vega was ailing and died. After his death, four men sought the post: 28-year-old first violinist José Francisco Rensoli, singer Luis Lazo, maestro Cayetano Solis and the Catalan Cayetano Pagueras, a religious composer and first contralto. The matter was to be decided by competitive examination. Pagueras was a strong candidate, regarding himself as a maestro in four arts: plainsong, organ playing, counterpoint and composition.

All were set for the examination when a letter, written on 29 July, 1803, arrived at the cathedral. It was from Goetz, offering his service.

Goetz arrived in Havana at the beginning of November 1803, having applied for naturalization as a Spanish subject. Later that month, the town council, duly impressed with his competence, appointed him interim holder of the desired position. Pagueras and Rensoli set out to make his work as difficult as possible. "When Goetz appeared before the choir, he was surrounded by pale, half-scared smiles" (Carpentier, p136). After looking, listening and questioning, he wrote a first report to the town council full of acute assessments of key members of the choir:

"Cayetano Pagueras: Second contralto, terrible voice, no expressiveness. Almost blind... A good composer, but he doesn't know how to sing his own works."
"Don Luis Lazo: Third contralto. Knows nothing of music, and never will. He entered the chapel fraudulently, and... is totally inept; superfluous."
"Don Juan Alcayado: Third tenor. Terrible voice. He hardly attends, and when he does, he speaks constantly, disturbing the others... A totally useless human being. The position of third tenor is hereby abolished for its superfluousness."

As a good musician, he reduced the number of positions, moved young singers up in status and recommended that any reduced in rank should retake the exam, both theoretical and practical. Under his plan in 1806, the singers and musicians were: choirmaster, four sopranos, two contraltos, two tenors, a baritone; two clarinets, two bassoons, two horns, four violins, bass viol, and bass.

References 

18th-century Austrian Roman Catholic priests
Academic staff of the University of Vienna
Austrian Roman Catholic missionaries
Cuban composers
Male composers
19th-century Cuban Roman Catholic priests
18th-century births
19th-century deaths
Roman Catholic missionaries in Cuba
Austrian expatriates in Cuba
Cuban male musicians